Lorraine is a feminine given name, which is simply from the name of the region of Lorraine in France and the dish quiche Lorraine. It has been used in the English-speaking world (especially the United States and Canada) since the Franco-Prussian War, during which events brought Lorraine, France to the North American public imagination. It is a Danish, English, Finnish, Norwegian, and Swedish modern form of the Germanic Chlothar (which is a blended form of Hlūdaz and Harjaz).

People 

 Lorraine Bracco (born 1954), American actress
 Lorraine Broderick (born 1948), American television soap opera writer
 Lorraine Chase (born 1951), English actress and model
 Lorraine Cheshire (born 1958), English actress
 Lorraine Cole (born 1967), English badminton player and Coach
 Lorraine Collett (1892–1983), American model
 Lorraine Ellison (1931–1983), American soul singer
 Lorraine Fenton (born 1973), Jamaican athlete
 Lorraine Hansberry (1930–1965), American playwright
 Lorraine Hunt Lieberson (1954–2006), American mezzo-soprano
 Lorraine Kelly (born 1959), Scottish broadcaster
 Lorraine Landon (born 1947), Australian basketball administrator and former player and coach
 Lorraine Malach (1933–2003), Canadian artist
 Lorraine McIntosh (born 1964), female vocalist, with the Scottish pop band, Deacon Blue
 Lorraine McNamara (born 1999), American ice dancer
 Lorraine Segato (born 1956), Canadian pop singer-songwriter
 Lorraine Nicholson (born 1990), American actress
 Lorraine Pascale (born 1972), British model and TV chef
 Lorraine Pearson (born 1967), English vocalist, formerly with the band Five Star
 Lorraine Warren (1927–2019), American paranormal investigator

Fictional characters
 Lorraine Baines McFly, the mother of Marty McFly in the Back to the Future trilogy

 Lorraine Thompson, character from The Thompsons

See also

 Loraine (name)
 Lorraine (disambiguation)
 Lorrain (disambiguation)
 Rainie (disambiguation)
 House of Lorraine
 Cross of Lorraine
 Harry Lorayne

References

English feminine given names